Te Kawerau ā Maki, Te Kawerau a Maki, or Te Kawerau-a-Maki is a Māori iwi (tribe) of the Auckland Region of New Zealand. It had 251 registered adult members as of June 2017. Auckland Council gave it land for a marae at Te Henga (Bethells Beach) in 2018; it has no wharenui (meeting house) yet.

History
Te Kawerau ā Maki are the descendants of the rangatira (chief) Maki and his wife Rotu, who migrated with their family and followers from Kawhia to Tāmaki Makaurau (Auckland) in the early 1600s. Te Kawerau trace their ancestry from a number of Māori migration canoes, particularly the Tainui, but also Aotea, Tokomaru, Kahuitara and Kurahaupō. Tainui ancestors including Hoturoa and the tohunga Rakataura (Hape) are particularly important in Te Kawerau whakapapa, as is the ancient turehu ancestor and tohunga Tiriwa. Maki and his people were related to a number of groups who had occupied the Auckland region since the fourteenth century, including the Tainui hapū (sub-tribes) collectively known as Ngā Oho. Maki was particularly connected with the Ngāiwi group, who lived across the Auckland isthmus and to the south from Māngere Mountain to Manurewa. Maki took up residence at Manurewa and Rarotonga / Mount Smart.

Maki lived for a while near Waimauku at the invitation of a chief of the district. While there Maki was insulted in an incident called Te Kawe Rau a Maki, meaning "the carrying strap of Maki". In response he and his warriors fought several battles against the local hapū, defeating them and taking control of a large part of the south Kaipara. Maki and Rotu had a son who was named Tawhiakiterangi, and also known as Te Kawerau ā Maki, after whom the tribe is named.

Their rohe or area of customary interest grew to include the southern Kaipara, Mahurangi, North Shore, Auckland isthmus, and Hauraki Gulf islands such as Tiritiri Matangi. By the end of the 1600s Te Kawerau ā Maki were particularly associated with West Auckland (known traditionally as Hikurangi), south-western Kaipara and the upper Waitematā Harbour. The Waitākere Ranges and the forest that once covered much of Hikurangi are known by the traditional name Te Wao nui a Tiriwa – the great forest of Tiriwa. The many peaks north of the Waitākere Ranges east of Muriwai around Taupaki became known as Ngā Rau Pou a Maki, or the many posts of Maki.

Europeans arriving in the late 1700s and early 1800s brought epidemic diseases that weakened Te Kawerau ā Maki and other tribes that were living in the same area by then. From 1821 the Musket Wars reached Auckland through raids by the Ngāpuhi tribe, led by Hongi Hika. In 1825 Te Kawerau ā Maki suffered major losses at the hands of Ngāpuhi and they and other Auckland tribes went into exile in the Waikato. Te Kawerau ā Maki remained there until 1835, when they returned to the Waitakere area, and later the south Kaipara, under the protection of the Waikato chief Te Wherowhero.

Recent events
In September 2015 the Te Kawerau ā Maki Claims Settlement Act was passed into legislation. This Act records the acknowledgements and apology given by the Crown to Te Kawerau ā Maki and gives effect to provisions of the deed of settlement that settles the historical Treaty of Waitangi claims of Te Kawerau ā Maki.

In late 2017 Te Kawerau ā Maki issued a rāhui (ban) on people entering the Waitākere Ranges, in order to help slow the spread of kauri dieback disease.

Te Kawerau ā Maki were the official host iwi in 2018 for Auckland Council's annual Matariki Festival. As part of this, amongst other activities, they organised the festival's official dawn ceremony launch at the Arataki Visitor Centre, a sound and light display on the Auckland Harbour Bridge, and an exhibition of their history at Te Uru Waitakere Contemporary Gallery.

See also
List of Māori iwi
Ōtuataua and Ihumātao

References

Further reading
A brief history, Te Kawerau Iwi Tribal Authority

External links
Te Kawerau a Maki, Te Kawerau Iwi Tribal Authority

 
Iwi and hapū
Waitākere Ranges
West Auckland, New Zealand